The Centre for Occupational and Health Psychology (COHP) is a Cardiff University research centre founded in 1999 to conduct research into the effects of occupational factors on health and performance efficiency. In addition, the risk factors relating to ill-health are investigated and the effects of health-related behaviour and health status on cognitive performance, mood and physiological functioning examined.

The Unit is directed by Professor Andy Smith and research is conducted by post-doctoral fellows, research associates and post-graduate students.

Topics of research 
Previous research projects have included:
 Minor illnesses and cognition
 The Psychology of the common cold
 Combined effects of occupational health hazards
 Method development study to assess the effect of colds on performance, perceived workload and mood
 Effects of guarana and alcohol on mood and performance changes following consumption of lager
 Adverse effects of night-time aircraft noise
 Physiological and psychological markers for adjustment to shiftwork offshore
 Noise and insomnia
 Health-care evaluation and assessment of education in patients with chronic fatigue syndrome
 An investigation of the effects of fibre in breakfast cereal on subjective reports of energy and mood
 Aromas, cognitive performance and mood
 The scale and impact of illegal drug use by workers 
 Use and impact of prescribed medication on work performance
 Psychological markers for adjustment to shiftwork offshore
 Ethnicity, work characteristics, stress and health 
 Effects of caffeine on mood, cognition and drink acceptability
 Aromas and cognitive performance
 Seafarer Fatigue: The Cardiff Research Programme 
 An investigation of the effects of inulin on energy, mood and cognitive function
 The acute effects of inulin on subjective reports of well-being and objective measures of cognitive performance
 An investigation of the effects of Yakult fermented drink on mood and cognitive function
 Effects of probiotics on subjective reports of energy and mood
 Evaluation of free school breakfasts initiative 
 An investigation of the effects of breakfast cereals on well-being
 Prediction and reduction of car crashes
 Occupational Health and Safety: culture, advice and performance
 Seafarers' Fatigue: The International Perspective
 Effects of chewing gum on memory and test performance
 European Framework for safe, efficient and environmentally-friendly ship operations (FLAGSHIP)
 Healthy Minds at Work 
 The relationship between work/working and improved health, safety and well-being

References 

Psychology institutes
Medical and health organisations based in Wales
Cardiff University
Psychology organisations based in the United Kingdom